The Aquia Formation is a geologic sandstone formation that extends from the upper Chesapeake Bay to the James River near Hopewell, Virginia.  It consists of clayey, silty, very shelly, glauconitic sand.   Fossil records indicate that this stratigraphic unit was created during the  Paleocene.

The Aquia formation was named for Aquia Creek where it is exposed in cliff faces along the banks.

Geology

Lithology

When uncovered, it appears dark green to gray-green, argillaceous, with well sorted fine- to medium-grained sand and locally indurated shell beds.  It is between 0 and 100 feet thick in Maryland. Quartz and phosphatic pebbles and/or very coarse glauconitic quartz sand mark the base of the unit. A few hard streaks of shells or thin "rock" layers are often reported but appear to be more abundant in the sections south of the James River.

Stratigraphy
The Aquia formation is overlain by the Nanjemoy Formation and overlies the Brightseat Formation.

The Aquia formation is broken down into two members: the lower Piscataway member and upper Paspotansa member.

Age

The Aquia Formation is thought to be 59.0-55.5 million years old.  The Piscataway member is 59-56.25 million years old, and the Paspotansa member is 56-55.5 million years old.  This is the Paleocene period.

Older publications describe the Aquia as being of Eocene age.

Fossils

Vertebrates

Bony fish
Lepisosteus
Ostracion
Phyllodus
Scomberomorus
Labridae (Wrasse)

Chondrichthyes

Sharks
Abdounia beaugei
Anomotodon novus
Carcharias hopei
Cretolamna appendiculata
Delpitoscyllium africanum
Foumtizia abdouni
Galeorhinus
Ginglymostoma subafricanum
Heterodontus lerichei
Hypotodus verticalis
Isurolamna inflata
Megasqualus orpiensis
Notidanodon loozi
Odontaspisx loozi
Orectolobiform
Otodus obliquus
Pachygaleus lefevrei
Palaeogaleus
Paleocarcharodon orientalis
Paleohypotodus rutoti
Paraorthacodus clarkii
Physogaleus secundus
Premontreia subulidens
Scyliorhinus
Squalus
Squatina prima
Striatolamia macrota
Striatolamia striata
Triakis

Rays
Myliobatis
Burnhamia
Coupatezia soutersi
Dasyatis
Hypolophodon sylvestris
Ischyodusx sylvestris

Reptiles

Crocodylians
Eosuchus
Hyposaurus
Thecachampsa
Thoracosaurus

Turtles
Trionyx

Mammals
Mammal fossils are extremely rare.

Birds
Bird fossils are extremely rare.

Molluscs

Gastropods
Turritella is very common.
Pleurotoma potomacensis

Bivalves
Crassatelites alaeformis
Cucullaea gigantea
Dosiniopsis lenticularis
Meretrix ovata
Modiolus alabamensis
Ostrea compressirostra
Panopea elongata
Venericardia planicosta
Vulsella alabamensis

Cephalopods
Cimomia marylandensis is present but uncommon.

See also

 List of fossiliferous stratigraphic units in Virginia
 Paleontology in Virginia
 Aquia Creek sandstone
 Public Quarry at Government Island

References

Geologic formations of Maryland
Geologic formations of New Jersey
Geologic formations of Virginia
Paleocene Series of North America
Paleogene Maryland
Paleogene geology of New Jersey
Paleogene geology of Virginia
Thanetian Stage
Sandstone formations of the United States